Harold Lewis Morphy (6 March 1902 – 1 August 1987) was a British rower who competed for Great Britain at the 1924 Summer Olympics.

Biography
Born in Patras, Greece, on 6 March 1902, Morphy was educated at Bedford School. He was placed fourth in the men's coxed eight at the 1924 Paris Olympics. He served in the British Army during the Second World War and died in Patras, Greece in 1987.

References

External links
 

1902 births
1987 deaths
People educated at Bedford School
English male rowers
British male rowers
Olympic rowers of Great Britain
Rowers at the 1924 Summer Olympics
British Army personnel of World War II